In linguistics, a gerund ( abbreviated ) is any of various nonfinite verb forms in various languages; most often, but not exclusively, one that functions as a noun. In English, it has the properties of both verb and noun, such as being modifiable by an adverb and being able to take a direct object. The term "-ing form" is often used in English to refer to the gerund specifically. Traditional grammar makes a distinction within -ing forms between present participles and gerunds, a distinction that is not observed in such modern grammars as A Comprehensive Grammar of the English Language and The Cambridge Grammar of the English Language.

Traditional use

The Latin gerund, in a restricted set of syntactic contexts, denotes the sense of the verb in isolation after certain prepositions, and in certain uses of the genitive, dative, and ablative cases. It is very rarely combined with dependent sentence elements such as object. To express such concepts, the construction with the adjectival gerundive is preferred. By contrast, the term gerund has been used in the grammatical description of other languages to label verbal nouns used in a wide range of syntactic contexts and with a full range of clause elements.

Thus, English grammar uses gerund to mean an -ing form used in non-finite clauses such as playing on computers. This is not a normal use for a Latin gerund. Moreover, the clause may function within a sentence as subject or object, which is impossible for a Latin gerund.
Playing on computers is fun. (-ing clause as Subject)
I like playing on computers (-ing clause as Object)
The contrast with the Latin gerund is also clear when the clause consists of a single word.
Computing is fun. ("gerund" as Subject)
I like computing ("gerund" as Object)
Latin never uses the gerund in this way, since the infinitive is available.

Traditional English grammar distinguishes non-finite clauses used as above from adverbial use, adjective-like modification of nouns, and use in finite progressive (continuous) forms
Playing on computers, they whiled the day away.
 The boys playing on computers are my nephews.
They are always playing on computers.
In these uses playing is traditionally labelled a participle.

Traditional grammar also distinguishes -ing forms with exclusively noun properties as in 

The objection to the term gerund in English grammar is that -ing forms are frequently used in ways that do not conform to the clear-cut three-way distinction made by traditional grammar into gerunds, participles and nouns.

Latin gerund

Form
The Latin gerund is a form of the verb. It is composed of:
 the infectum stem (the stem used to form Present and Imperfect tense forms)
 a vowel appropriate to the verb class or conjugation of the verb
 the suffix -nd- 
 a nominal Inflectional ending
For example,

Related gerundive forms are composed in a similar way with adjectival inflexional endings.

Function
The four inflections are used for a limited range of grammatical functions

These functions could be fulfilled by other abstract nouns derived from verbs such as vẽnãtiõ 'hunting'. Gerunds are distinct in two ways.
 Every Latin verb can regularly form a gerund
 A gerund may function syntactically in the same way as a finite verb. Typically the gerund of a finite verb may be followed by a direct object e.g. ad discernendum vocis verbi figuras 'for discerning figures of speech', hominem investigando opera dabo 'I will devote effort to investigating the man'.
 However, this was a rare construction. Writers generally preferred the gerundive construction e.g. res evertendae reipublicae 'matters concerning the overthrow of the state' (literally 'of the state being overthrown').

When people first wrote grammars of languages such as English, and based them on works of Latin grammar, they adopted the term gerund to label non-finite verb forms with these two properties.

Gerunds in various languages
Meanings of the term gerund as used in relation to various languages are listed below.
 Latin has the non-finite gerundium, formed with in -andum, -endum and noun inflexions. It is the syntactic equivalent to a noun, except in the nominative and accusative cases, which use the infinitive. In particular the ablative case forms (-ando, -endo) were used adverbially. Latin grammars written in English use the form gerund. See the section above for further detail.
 Several Romance languages have inherited the form, but without case inflections. They use it primarily in an adverbial function, comparably to the Latin ablative use. The same form may be used in an adjectival function and to express progressive aspect meaning. These languages do not use the term present participle. Grammars of these languages written in English may use the form gerund.
 Italian gerundio: stem form + -ando or -endo
Spanish gerundio: stem form + -ando or -iendo
Portuguese gerúndio: stem form + -ando, -endo or -indo
 Romanian gerunziu: stem form + -ând(u) or -ind(u)
 Catalan and French have inherited not the gerund form but the Latin present participle form in -nt. 
 Catalan gerundi: stem form + -ant or -ent
 French stem form + -ant. French grammar maintains a distinction between:
participe présent when the form is used adjectivally, and may be inflected for gender and number.
gérondif when the form is used adverbially, without inflection, generally after the preposition en. In Modern French, the gérondif cannot be used to express progressive meaning.
Grammars of French written in English may use the forms gerundive and present participle.
 In the earliest stages of the West Germanic languages, the infinitive was inflected after a preposition. These dative and, more rarely, genitive case forms are sometimes called gerundium or gerund or West Germanic gerund.

Old English to berenne (to bear) dative of beran
Old High German zi beranne dative of beran
Old Saxon berannia dative of beran
Old Frisian beranne
 The modern continental successor languages German and Dutch have preserved a few vestiges of these forms, which are sometimes termed gerundium.
 Frisian preserves the original distinction, e.g. West Frisian freegje ("ask") - te freegjen
 English has no vestige of the West Germanic gerund. Traditional grammar uses the term gerund for the -ing form of a verb when it is used as a noun (for example, the verb reading in the sentence "I enjoy reading."). See the sections below for further detail.
 In Dutch, it translates either the term "gerundium" or the description "zelfstandig gebruikte, verbogen onbepaalde wijs van het werkwoord". The infinitive form of the verb is used as gerund, e.g. Zwemmen is gezond.
 Since Afrikaans has by and large lost explicit morphological marking of the infinitive form of the verb, verb stems are used as gerunds, e.g. Swem is gesond.

 In Arabic, it refers to the verb's action noun, known as the masdar form. This form ends in a tanwin and is generally the equivalent of the -ing ending in English.
 In Persian, it refers to the verb's action noun, known as the ism-masdar form.
 In Hebrew, it refers either to the verb's action noun, or to the part of the infinitive following the infinitival prefix (also called the infinitival construct).
 In Hungarian, it practically refers to the verbal noun, formed by appending a suffix. Common suffixes are -ás (adás, giving), -és (kérés, asking). 
 In Japanese, it designates verb and verbals adjective forms in dictionary form paired with the referral particle no, which turns the verbal into a concept or property noun, or also can refer to the -te form of a verb.
 In Korean, it refers to the word '것'('thing') modified by the adjective form of the verb.
 In Bulgarian, it translates the term  (deepriʧastije). It refers to the verb noun formed by adding the suffix - (-jki) to the verb form, like  (hodi, he/she/it walks) -  (hodejki, while walking)
 In Macedonian, it refers to the verb noun formed by adding the suffix - (-jḱi) to the verb form, like in јаде (jade, he eats) —  (jadejḱi, while eating).
 In Turkish, it refers to a large number of verb endings subject to vowel harmony and sometimes used in conjunction with postpositions. Called zarf-fiil, bağ-fiil, ulaç or gerundium and defined as "a verb used as an adverb in a sentence", the Turkish gerund may also constitute part of an (adverbial) clause.
 In Polish, it refers to the verbal noun, formed by appending a suffix. Common suffixes are -anie (pływanie, swimming), -enie (jedzenie, eating).
 In Serbo-Croatian, it refers to the verbal noun, formed by appending a suffix. Common suffixes are -anje (plivanje, swimming), -enje (jedenje, eating).
 In Russian, it translates the term  (dejepričastije) an adverbial participle formed with the suffixes - (-ja) Present; - (-v) or - (-vši) Past.
 In Dhivehi, the gerund is the root form of the verb, for example, meaning "dancing".

In other languages, it may refer to almost any non-finite verb form; however, it most often refers to an action noun, by analogy with its use as applied to Latin.

Gerunds in English
In traditional grammars of English, the term gerund labels an important use of the form of the verb ending in -ing (for details of its formation and spelling, see English verbs). Other important uses are termed 
participle (used adjectivally or adverbially), and as a pure verbal noun.

An -ing form is termed gerund when it behaves as a verb within a clause (so that it may be modified by an adverb or have an object); but the resulting clause as a whole (sometimes consisting of only one word, the gerund itself) functions as a noun within the larger sentence.

For example, consider the sentence "Eating this cake is easy." Here, the gerund is the verb eating, which takes an object this cake. The entire clause eating this cake is then used as a noun, which in this case serves as the subject of the larger sentence.

An item such as eating this cake in the foregoing example is an example of a non-finite verb phrase; however, because phrases of this type do not require a subject, it is also a complete clause. (Traditionally, such an item would be referred to as a phrase, but in modern linguistics it has become common to call it a clause.) A gerund clause such as this is one of the types of non-finite clause. The structure may be represented as follows:

Formation
Non-finite verb forms ending in -ing, whether termed gerund or participle may be marked like finite forms as Continuous or Non-continuous, Perfect or Non-perfect, Active or Passive. Thus, traditional grammars have represented the gerund as having 
four forms  two for the active voice and two for the passive:

The same forms are available when the term participle is used.

Examples of use 
The following sentences illustrate some uses of gerund clauses, showing how such a clause serves as a noun within the larger sentence. In some cases, the clause consists of just the gerund (although in many such cases the word could equally be analyzed as a pure verbal noun).
 Swimming is fun. (gerund as subject of the sentence)
 I like swimming. (gerund as direct object)
 I never gave swimming all that much effort. (gerund as indirect object)
 Swimming in the pool is one way to relax. (gerund phrase as subject)
 Do you fancy swimming in the pool? (gerund phrase as direct object)
 After swimming in the pool, he ate his lunch. (gerund phrase as the complement of a preposition)

Using gerunds of the appropriate auxiliary verbs, one can form gerund clauses that express perfect aspect and passive voice:
 Being deceived can make someone feel angry. (passive)
 Having read the book once before makes me more prepared. (perfect)
 He is ashamed of having been gambling all night. (perfect progressive aspect)

For more detail on when it is appropriate to use a gerund, see Verb patterns classified as gerund use below, and also .

Distinction from other uses of the -ing form
In traditional grammars, gerunds are distinguished from other uses of a verb's -ing form: the present participle (which is a non-finite verb form like the gerund, but is adjectival or adverbial in function), and the pure verbal noun or deverbal noun.

The distinction between gerund and present participles is not recognised in modern reference grammars, since many uses are ambiguous.

Roles of "gerund" clauses in a sentence

Non finite -ing clauses may have the following roles in a sentence:

In traditional grammars, the term gerund is not used for roles F, G, and H.

Thus

For more details and examples, see -ing: uses.

"Gerund" clauses with a specified subject 
In traditional grammars, a grammatical subject has been defined in such a way that it occurs only in finite clauses, where it is liable to "agree" with the "number" of the finite verb form. Nevertheless, non-finite clauses imply a "doer" of the verb, even if that doer is indefinite "someone or something". For example,
 We enjoy singing. (ambiguous: somebody sings, possibly ourselves)
 Licking the cream was a special treat (somebody licked the cream)
 Being awarded the prize is a great honour (someone is or may be awarded the prize)

Often the "doer" is clearly signalled
 We enjoyed singing yesterday (we ourselves sang)
 The cat responded by licking the cream (the cat licked the cream)
 His heart is set on being awarded the prize (he hopes he himself will be awarded the prize)
 Meg likes eating apricots (Meg herself eats apricots)

However, the "doer" may not be indefinite or already expressed in the sentence. Rather it must be overtly specified, typically in a position immediately before the non-finite verb
 We enjoyed them singing.
 The cat licking the cream was not generally appreciated.
 We were delighted at Paul being awarded the prize.
The "doer" expression is not the grammatical subject of a finite clause, so objective them is used rather than subjective they.

Traditional grammarians may object to the term subject for these "doers". And prescriptive grammarians go further, objecting to the use of forms more appropriate to the subjects (or objects) of finite clauses. The argument is that this results in two noun expressions with no grammatical connection. They prefer to express the "doer" by a possessive form, such as used with ordinary nouns:
 We enjoyed their singing. (cf their voices, their attempt to sing)
 The cat's licking the cream was not generally appreciated. (cf the cat's purr, the cat's escape)
 We were delighted at Paul's being awarded the prize. (cf Paul's nomination, Paul's acceptance)
Nonetheless, the possessive construction with -ing clauses is very rare in present-day English. Works of fiction show a moderate frequency, but the construction is highly infrequent in other types of text.

Prescriptivists do not object when the non-finite clause modifies a noun phrase
 I saw the cat licking the cream.
The sense of the cat as notional subject of licking is disregarded. Rather they see the cat as exclusively the object of I saw The modifying phrase licking the cream is therefore described as a participle use.

Henry Fowler claims that the use of a non-possessive noun to precede a gerund arose as a result of confusion with the above usage with a participle, and should thus be called fused participle or geriple.

It has been argued that if the prescriptive rule is followed, the difference between the two forms may be used to make a slight distinction in meaning:
 The teacher's shouting startled the student. (shouting is a gerund, the shouting startled the student)
 The teacher shouting startled the student. (shouting can be interpreted as a participle, qualifying the teacher; the teacher startled the student by shouting)
 I don't like Jim's drinking wine. (I don't like the drinking)
 I don't like Jim drinking wine. (I don't like Jim when he is drinking wine)

However, Quirk et al. show that the range of senses of -ing forms with possessive and non-possessive subjects is far more diverse and nuanced:

These sentence exemplify a spectrum of senses from more noun-like to more verb--like. At the extremes of the spectrum they place

 at the noun end (where possessive Brown's unmistakably expresses ownership) :

 and at the verb end (where Brown's would clearly be impossible):

In some cases, particularly with a non-personal subject, the use of the possessive before a gerund may be considered redundant even in quite a formal register. For example, "There is no chance of the snow falling" (rather than the prescriptively correct "There is no chance of the snow's falling").

Verb patterns classified as "gerund" use
The term gerund describes certain uses of -ing clauses as 'complementation' of individual English verbs, that is to say the choice of class that are allowable after that word.

The principal choices of clauses are

 The term gerund is applied to clauses similar to [4a] and [4b].
 In [6a] and [6b] coming is related to the participle use as an adverbial.
 in [5a] and [5b] the verbs kept and coming refer to the same event. Coming is related to the progressive aspect use in She is coming.
 Verbs such as start and stop, although similar to verbs like keep, are generally classified with verbs like remember. Therefore, She started coming is termed a gerund use.
 The proposed test of passivisation to distinguish gerund use after remember from participle use after keep fails with sentences like [5b].
 The proposed test of possible possessive subject successfully distinguishes [4b] (traditional gerund) from [5b] (traditionally participle). 
 The variant * We kept Jane's coming is not grammatically acceptable.
 The variant I remember Jane's coming is acceptable — indeed required by prescriptive grammarians

Verbs followed by "gerund" pattern

Historically, the -ing suffix was attached to a limited number of verbs to form abstract nouns, which were used as the object of verbs such as like. The use was extended in various ways: the suffix became attachable to all verbs; the nouns acquired verb-like characteristics; the range of verbs allowed to introduce the form spread by analogy first to other verbs expressing emotion, then by analogy to other semantic groups of verbs associated with abstract noun objects; finally the use spread from verbs taking one-word objects to other semantically related groups verbs.

The present-day result of these developments is that the verbs followed by -ing forms tend to fall into semantic classes. The following groups have been derived from analysis of the most common verbs in the COBUILD data bank:

Pattern 4a: I remember seeing her come

'LIKE' AND 'DISLIKE' GROUP
adore, appreciate, (cannot|) bear, (not) begrudge, detest, dislike, (cannot) endure, enjoy, hate, like, loathe, love, (not) mind, mind, prefer, relish, resent, (cannot) stand, (cannot) stomach, (not) tolerate, take to

dread, (not) face. fancy, favour, fear, look forward to

'CONSIDER' GROUP
anticipate, consider, contemplate, debate, envisage, fantasise, imagine, intend, visualise

'REMEMBER' GROUP
forget, miss, recall, recollect, regret, remember, (cannot) remember

'RECOMMEND' GROUP
acknowledge, admit, advise, advocate, debate, deny, describe, forbid, mention, prohibit, propose, recommend, report, suggest, urge
 
'INVOLVE' GROUP
allow, entail, involve, justify, mean, necessitate, permit, preclude, prevent, save

'POSTPONE' GROUP
defer, delay, postpone, put off

'NEED' GROUP
deserve, need, require, want

'RISK' GROUP
chance, risk

OTHERS WITH -ING OBJECT
discourage, encourage, endure, mime, practise, get away with, go into. go towards, go without, play at

Pattern 5a: She kept coming

In addition, the COBUILD team identifies four groups of verbs followed by -ing forms that are hard to class as objects. In the verb + -ing object construction the action or state expressed by the verb can be separated from the action or state expressed by the -ing form. In the following groups, the senses are inseparable, jointly expressing a single complex action or state. Some grammarians do not recognise all these patterns as gerund use.
 
'START' AND 'STOP' GROUP
begin, cease, come, commence, continue, finish, get, go, (not) go, keep, quit, resume, start, stop, burst out, carry on, fall about, fall to, give over, give up, go about, go around/round, go on, keep on, leave off, take to

'AVOID' GROUP
avoid, (not) bother, escape, evade, forbear, omit, (cannot) resist, shun, hold off

'TRY' GROUP
chance, risk, try

'GO RIDING' GROUP
come, go

Pattern 4b: I remember her coming
Verbs with this pattern do not normally allow the 'subject' of the -ing clause to be used in an equivalent passive construction such as *She is remembered coming. 
The COBUILD Guide analyses her coming as the single object of I remember.

Many of the verbs that allow pattern 4a (without object) also allow this pattern.

'LIKE' GROUP (verbs from the above 'LIKE' AND 'DISLIKE', 'DREAD AND LOOK FORWARD TO', 'CONSIDER' and 'REMEMBER' groups)
anticipate, envisage, appreciate, (cannot) bear, (not) begrudge, contemplate, dislike, dread, envisage, fear, forget, hate, (will not) have, imagine, like, (not) mind, picture, recall, recollect, remember, (not) remember, resent, see, stand, tolerate, visualise, want, put up with

'REPORT' GROUP (subset of the above 'RECOMMEND' GROUP)
describe, mention, report

'ENTAIL' GROUP (subset of the above 'INVOLVE' GROUP)
entail, involve, justify, mean, necessitate

'STOP' GROUP (subset of the above 'START' AND 'STOP' GROUP)
avoid, preclude, prevent, prohibit, resist, save, stop

'RISK' GROUP (identical with above)
chance, risk

Pattern 5b: We kept her coming
In contrast to Pattern 4b, these verbs allow the 'subject' of the -ing clauses to be used in an equivalent passive construction such as She was kept coming. 

The COBUILD guide analyses her coming as a string of two objects of We kept:– (1)her and (2)coming.

'SEE' GROUP
 catch, feel, find, hear, notice, observe, photograph (usually passive), picture (usually passive), see, show, watch

'BRING' GROUP
bring, have, keep, leave, send, set

Pattern 6a: She ended up coming
These verbs refer to starting, spending or ending time. 
The following -ing form is an adverbial, traditionally classed as a participle rather than a gerund.

die, end up, finish up, hang around, start off, wind up

Pattern 6b: She wasted time coming
These verbs also relate to time (and, by extension, money). The object generally expresses this concept. 
However, the object of busy or occupy must be a reflexive pronoun e.g. She busied herself coming. 
The following -ing form is an adverbial, generally classed as a participle rather than a gerund.

begin, busy, end, finish, kill, occupy, pass, spend, start, take, waste

Verbs followed by either "gerund" or to-infinitive pattern
Like the -ing suffix, the to-infinitive spread historically from a narrow original use, a prepositional phrase referring to future time. Like the -ing form it spread to all English verbs and to form non-finite clauses. Like the -ing form, it spread by analogy to use with words of similar meaning.

A number of verbs now belong in more than one class in their choice of 'complementation'.

Patterns 4a and 3a: I remember seeing her come and She remembered to come

Verbs in both 'START' AND 'STOP' (-ing) GROUP and 'BEGIN' ('to+infinitive) GROUPS
begin, cease, come, commence, continue, get, start, 
Also go on — with different meanings
She went on singing — 'She continued singing'
She went on to sing — 'Afterwards, she sang'
She went on at me to sing — 'She nagged me to sing' (i.e. that I should sing)
Superficially, stop appears to be used in the 3a (to-infinitive) pattern
She stopped to sing — 'She stopped in order to sing'
However, the phrase to sing is quite separate and separable
 She stopped for a moment to sing
 She stopped what she was doing to sing
 And the phrase may be used in all manner of sentences
She travelled to Paris to sing
She abandoned her husband and her children to sing

Verbs in both 'DREAD' AND LOOK FORWARD TO' (-ing) GROUP and 'HOPE' ('to+infinitive) GROUPS
dread, fear

Verb in both 'CONSIDER' (-ing) GROUP and 'HOPE' ('to+infinitive) GROUPS
intend

Verb in both 'REMEMBER' (-ing) GROUP and 'MANAGE' ('to+infinitive) GROUPS
remember — with different meanings
I remembered going —'I remembered that I had previously gone'
I remembered to go —'I remembered that I had to go, so I did go'

Verbs in both 'NEED' (-ing) GROUP and 'NEED' ('to+infinitive) GROUPS
deserve, need

Patterns 4a, 4b, 3a and 3b: I remember coming, She remembered to come, I remember her coming and I reminded her to come
Verbs in both 'LIKE AND DISLIKE' (-ing) and WITH OBJECT (to-infinitive) GROUPS
hate, like, love, prefer
Unlike other Pattern 3b verbs, the object is indivisible
He hates his wife to stand out in a crowd does not mean He hates his wife
With would there is often a difference of meaning
I like living in Ambridge — 'I live in Ambridge, and I like it'
I would like to live in Ambridge — 'I don't live in Ambridge, but I have a desire to live there in the future'
I would like living in Ambridge — 'I don't live in Ambridge, but if I ever did live there, I would enjoy it'
There is an apparent similarity between
I like boxing — 'I box and I enjoy it'
I like boxing — 'I watch other people boxing and I enjoy it'
However, only the former meaning is possible with an extended non-finite clause
I like boxing with an experienced opponent — 'I like it when I box with an experienced opponent'

Patterns 4a and 3b: I remember coming and I reminded her to come
Verbs in both 'RECOMMEND' (-ing) and 'TELL' or 'NAG' AND 'COAX'(to-infinitive) GROUPS
advise, forbid, recommend, urge
These verbs do not admit -ing Pattern 4b with a word serving as object of the RECOMMEND verb. However they can be used with a possessive 'subject' of the -ing form.
I advised leaving — 'I advised somebody (unidentified) that we (or the person or people we have in mind) should leave'
I advised him to leave — 'I advised him that he should leave' but not *I advised him leaving
I advised his leaving — 'I advised somebody (unidentified) that he should leave

Verbs in both 'CONSIDER' (-ing) and 'BELIEVE' or 'EXPECT' (to-infinitive) GROUPS
consider, intend

Patterns 4b and 3b: I remember her coming and I reminded her to come

Verbs in both the 'SEE ' (-ing) and 'OBSERVE' (to-infinitive) GROUPS
hear, see, observe
The to-infinitive pattern occurs in passive clauses e.g. She was seen to come.
Corresponding active clauses use the bare infinitive pattern, e.g., We saw her come.

Verbs in both the 'SEE ' (-ing) and 'BELIEVE' (to-infinitive) GROUPS
feel, find, show (usually passive)

Verb in both the 'ENTAIL' subgroup (-ing) and the 'EXPECT' (to-infinitive) GROUPS
mean — with different meanings
That means her going tomorrow — 'In that case she'll go tomorrow'
We mean her to go tomorrow — 'We intend that she'll go tomorrow'
She's meant to be here tomorrow — 'It is intended that she'll be here tomorrow'
She's meant to be here now — 'It was intended that she should be here now, but she isn't'

Patterns 5a and 3a: She kept coming and She remembered to come
Verb in both the 'TRY' (-ing) and 'TRY' (to-infinitive) GROUPS
try — with different meanings
She tried leaving — 'She left in order to see what might happen (or how she might feel)'
She tried to leave — 'She attempted to leave'

Verbs followed by either "gerund" or bare infinitive pattern

Patterns 4b and 2: I remember her coming and I saw her come
Verb in both the 'SEE ' (-ing) and 'SEE' (bare infinitive) GROUPS
feel. hear, notice, see,watch
These patterns are sometimes used to express different meanings
I saw him leaving — 'I saw him as he was leaving'
I saw him leave — 'I saw him as he left'

Borrowings of English -ing forms in other languages
English verb forms ending in -ing are sometimes borrowed into other languages. In some cases, they become pseudo-anglicisms, taking on new meanings or uses not found in English. For instance, camping means "campsite" in many languages, while parking often means a car park. Both these words are treated as nouns, with none of the features of the gerund in English. For more details and examples, see -ing words in other languages.

See also
 Gerundive
 Infinitive
 Non-finite verb
 Participle
 Verbal noun

References

External links
 
 

Syntactic entities
Verb types